Muscle tissue (or muscular tissue) is soft tissue that makes up the different types of muscles in most animals, and give the ability of muscles to contract. Muscle tissue is formed during embryonic development, in a process known as myogenesis. Muscle tissue contains special contractile proteins called actin and myosin which contract and relax to cause movement. Among many other muscle proteins present are two regulatory proteins, troponin and tropomyosin.

Muscle tissues vary with function and location in the body. In mammals the three types are: skeletal or striated muscle tissue; smooth muscle (non-striated) muscle; and cardiac muscle. Skeletal muscle tissue consists of elongated muscle cells called muscle fibers, and is responsible for movements of the body. Other tissues in skeletal muscle include tendons and perimysium. Smooth and cardiac muscle contract involuntarily, without conscious intervention. These muscle types may be activated both through the interaction of the central nervous system as well as by receiving innervation from peripheral plexus or endocrine (hormonal) activation. Striated or skeletal muscle only contracts voluntarily, upon the influence of the central nervous system. Reflexes are a form of non conscious activation of skeletal muscles, but nonetheless arise through activation of the central nervous system, albeit not engaging cortical structures until after the contraction has occurred.

The different muscle types vary in their response to neurotransmitters and hormones such as acetylcholine, noradrenaline, adrenaline, and nitric oxide depending on muscle type and the exact location of the muscle.

Sub-categorization of muscle tissue is also possible, depending on among other things the content of myoglobin, mitochondria, and myosin ATPase etc.

Structure

There are three types of muscle tissue in vertebrates: skeletal, cardiac, and smooth. Skeletal and cardiac muscle are types of striated muscle tissue. Smooth muscle is non-striated.

Skeletal muscle tissue is an elongated striated muscle tissue ranging from several millimeters to about 10 centimeters in length and from 10 to 100 micrometers in width. Skeletal striated muscle tissue is arranged in regular, parallel bundles of myofibrils containing the many contractile units known as sarcomeres, which give the tissue its striated (striped) appearance. Skeletal muscle, is voluntary muscle anchored by tendons or sometimes by aponeuroses to bones, and is used to effect skeletal movement such as locomotion and to maintain posture. Postural control is generally maintained as an unconscious reflex, but the muscles responsible can also react to conscious control. An average adult man is made up of 42% of skeletal muscle as a percentage of body mass, and an average adult woman is made up of 36%.

Cardiac muscle tissue, is found only in the walls of the heart as myocardium, and is involuntary being controlled by the autonomic nervous system. Cardiac muscle tissue is striated like skeletal muscle, containing contractile units called sarcomeres in highly regular arrangements of bundles. While skeletal muscles are arranged in regular, parallel bundles, cardiac muscle connects at branching, irregular angles known as intercalated discs.

Smooth muscle tissue is non-striated and involuntary. Smooth muscle is found within the walls of organs and structures such as the esophagus, stomach, intestines, bronchi, uterus, urethra, bladder, blood vessels, and the arrector pili in the skin which controls the erection of body hair.

Comparison of types

Skeletal muscle

Skeletal muscle is broadly classified into two fiber types: Type I slow-twitch, and Type II fast-twitch muscle.    
 Type I, slow-twitch, slow oxidative, or red muscle is dense with capillaries and is rich in mitochondria and myoglobin, giving the muscle tissue its characteristic red color. It can carry more oxygen and sustain aerobic activity.
 Type II, fast-twitch muscle, has three major kinds that are, in order of increasing contractile speed:
Type IIa, which, like a slow muscle, is aerobic, rich in mitochondria and capillaries and appears red when deoxygenated.
Type IIx (also known as type IId), which is less dense in mitochondria and myoglobin. This is the fastest muscle type in humans. It can contract more quickly and with a greater amount of force than oxidative muscle but can sustain only short, anaerobic bursts of activity before muscle contraction becomes painful (often incorrectly attributed to a build-up of lactic acid). N.B. in some books and articles this muscle in humans was, confusingly, called type IIB.
Type IIb, which is anaerobic, glycolytic, "white" muscle that is even less dense in mitochondria and myoglobin. In small animals like rodents, this is the major fast muscle type, explaining the pale color of their flesh.

The density of mammalian skeletal muscle tissue is about 1.06 kg/liter. This can be contrasted with the density of adipose tissue (fat), which is 0.9196 kg/liter. This makes muscle tissue approximately 15% denser than fat tissue.

Smooth muscle

Smooth muscle is involuntary and non-striated. It is divided into two subgroups: the single-unit (unitary) and multiunit smooth muscle. Within single-unit cells, the whole bundle or sheet contracts as a syncytium (i.e. a multinucleate mass of cytoplasm that is not separated into cells). Multiunit smooth muscle tissues innervate individual cells; as such, they allow for fine control and gradual responses, much like motor unit recruitment in skeletal muscle.

Smooth muscle is found within the walls of blood vessels (such smooth muscle specifically being termed vascular smooth muscle) such as in the tunica media layer of large (aorta) and small arteries, arterioles and veins. Smooth muscle is also found in lymphatic vessels, the urinary bladder, uterus (termed uterine smooth muscle), male and female reproductive tracts, gastrointestinal tract, respiratory tract, arrector pili of skin, the ciliary muscle, and iris of the eye. The structure and function is basically the same in smooth muscle cells in different organs, but the inducing stimuli differ substantially, in order to perform individual effects in the body at individual times. In addition, the glomeruli of the kidneys contain smooth muscle-like cells called mesangial cells.

Cardiac muscle

Cardiac muscle is involuntary, striated muscle that is found in the walls and histological foundation of the heart, specifically the myocardium. The cardiac muscle cells, (also called cardiomyocytes or myocardiocytes), predominantly contain only one nucleus, although populations with two to four nuclei do exist. The myocardium is the muscle tissue of the heart and forms a thick middle layer between the outer epicardium layer and the inner endocardium layer.

Coordinated contractions of cardiac muscle cells in the heart propel blood out of the atria and ventricles to the blood vessels of the left/body/systemic and right/lungs/pulmonary circulatory systems. This complex mechanism illustrates systole of the heart.

Cardiac muscle cells, unlike most other tissues in the body, rely on an available blood and electrical supply to deliver oxygen and nutrients and remove waste products such as carbon dioxide. The coronary arteries help fulfill this function.

Development

All muscles are derived from paraxial mesoderm. The paraxial mesoderm is divided along the embryo's length into somites, corresponding to the segmentation of the body (most obviously seen in the vertebral column. Each somite has three divisions, sclerotome (which forms vertebrae), dermatome (which forms skin), and myotome (which forms muscle). The myotome is divided into two sections, the epimere and hypomere, which form epaxial and hypaxial muscles, respectively. The only epaxial muscles in humans are the erector spinae and small intervertebral muscles, and are innervated by the dorsal rami of the spinal nerves. All other muscles, including those of the limbs are hypaxial, and innervated by the ventral rami of the spinal nerves.

During development, myoblasts (muscle progenitor cells) either remain in the somite to form muscles associated with the vertebral column or migrate out into the body to form all other muscles. Myoblast migration is preceded by the formation of connective tissue frameworks, usually formed from the somatic lateral plate mesoderm. Myoblasts follow chemical signals to the appropriate locations, where they fuse into elongate skeletal muscle cells.

Function

The primary function of muscle tissue is contraction. The three types of muscle tissue (skeletal, cardiac and smooth) have significant differences. However, all three use the movement of actin against myosin to create contraction.

Skeletal muscle
In skeletal muscle, contraction is stimulated by electrical impulses transmitted by the motor nerves. Cardiac and smooth muscle contractions are stimulated by internal pacemaker cells which regularly contract, and propagate contractions to other muscle cells they are in contact with. All skeletal muscle and many smooth muscle contractions are facilitated by the neurotransmitter acetylcholine.

Smooth muscle
Smooth muscle is found in almost all organ systems such as hollow organs including the stomach, and bladder; in tubular structures such as blood and lymph vessels, and bile ducts; in sphincters such as in the uterus, and the eye. In addition, it plays an important role in the ducts of exocrine glands. It fulfills various tasks such as sealing orifices (e.g. pylorus, uterine os) or the transport of the chyme through wavelike contractions of the intestinal tube. Smooth muscle cells contract more slowly than skeletal muscle cells, but they are stronger, more sustained and require less energy. Smooth muscle is also involuntary, unlike skeletal muscle, which requires a stimulus.

Cardiac muscle
Cardiac muscle is the muscle of the heart. It is self-contracting, autonomically regulated and must continue to contract in a rhythmic fashion for the whole life of the organism. Hence it has special features.

References

 
Muscular system